Mere Humdum Mere Dost is a Pakistani romantic drama series. It first aired on Urdu 1. It was directed by Shehzad Kashmiri and produced by Momina Duraid. This drama serial is based on Farhat Ishtiaq's novel of the same name.

Zindagi (India) started airing this series from 21 March 2016 onwards.

Storyline 

Aimen, a 20-year-old girl, lives in poverty with her mother, Zainab, in the small town of Nawabshah. When Aimen was an infant, her father, Taufeeq Kamaal, had separated from his first wife, Zainab, and remarried. Aimen resents her father for this. Just before her death, Zainab writes a letter to Taufeeq and requests that he look after Aimen. Taufeeq, now a business tycoon in Karachi, receives the letter when he is about to leave for Turkey with his second wife Almas and their son Sahir. By this time, Zainab has passed away. Taufeeq requests his friend and business partner, Haider Masood, to pick Aimen up from Nawabshah and bring her to Karachi.

While Taufeeq is away, Aimen stays with Haider and his aunt Bibi at their residence. Haider senses Aimen's loneliness and is kind to her. After Taufeeq returns, Aimen moves in with him and Almas but struggles to adjust to living with them. Haider encourages her to go for higher education and grooms her personality so that she can fit in with her father's elite social circle. Aimen and Haider gradually develop feelings for each other. Sajeela, Haider's ex-wife and Almas's sister, returns to Pakistan after a failed marriage to Mazhar. She hopes to remarry Haider. Sajeela tries to create tension between Aimen and Haider.

Feeling guilty about being in love with a girl who is 16 years younger than him, Haider suddenly decides to marry his old friend Fatima instead. Dejected, Aimen chooses to move back to her hometown Nawabshah. At the last moment, Haider confronts Aimen and admits his feelings for her. Haider and Aimen get formally engaged with the approval of their families.

Cast 
 Shakeel as Sajeela's and Almas's father
 Adnan Siddiqui as Haider (Taufeeq's business partner)
 Sanam Jung as Aimen (Taufeeq's daughter from his first wife Zainab)
 Hareem Farooq as Sajeela (Almas's sister & Haider's ex wife)
 Farhan Ali Agha as Taufeeq Kamaal (Husband of Zainab & Almas)
 Hani Nadeem Essani as Sahir (Taufeeq's son)
 Shamim Hilaly as Bibi (Haider's Aunt)
 Zainab Qayyum as Almas (Taufeeq's second wife)
 Junaid Khan as Mazhar (Sajeela's 2nd husband)
 Nazli Nasr as Zainab (Aimen's mother & Taufeeq's ex wife)
 Faraz Alam as Shaheer Javed (Aimen's Class Fellow who fall for her )

Nomination
 14th Lux Style Awards - Best Television Actor - Sanam Jung (Nominated)

Deviations From The Novel 

Farhat Ishtiaq has adapted her own novel, Mere Humdum Mere Dost, for the screen. Although nearly all of the plot is the same in the novel and the TV series, a few changes have been made. The role of Sajeela is not very prominent in the novel whereas, in the TV drama, she is a major character.

Soundtrack 
The OST is composed by Waqar Ali and is sung by singers Nida Arab and Adeeb Ahmed. The song was well received by the audience.

References

External links 
Urdu 1
Facebook Page

Pakistani drama television series
Urdu 1
Urdu-language television shows
Television series based on the novels of Farhat Ishtiaq
Pakistani television dramas based on novels